Plasma Surface Interaction (PSI) studies study the interaction at the interface between plasma and materials. Focus of the research lies on providing both theoretical and experimental support to the design and validation of plasma facing materials for the fusion experiment ITER and future devices.

Plasma physics